The House Subcommittee on Livestock, Dairy and Poultry is a subcommittee within the House Agriculture Committee.

The subcommittee was previously known as the Subcommittee on Livestock and Horticulture, but its duties were split at the start of the 110th Congress when the United States House Agriculture Subcommittee on Horticulture and Organic Agriculture was established. Between then and the 118th Congress it had jurisdiction over foreign agriculture and trade and was known as the Subcommittee on Livestock and Foreign Agriculture accordingly.

The Chair of the subcommittee is Democrat Jim Costa of California, and its Ranking Member is Dusty Johnson of South Dakota.

Jurisdiction
Policies, statutes, and markets relating to all livestock, poultry, dairy, and seafood, including all products thereof; the inspection, marketing, and promotion of such commodities and products; aquaculture; animal welfare; grazing; and related oversight of such issues.

Members, 118th Congress

Historical membership rosters

117th Congress

116th Congress

115th Congress

External links
Subcommittee page

References

Agriculture Livestock, Dairy, and Poultry